Senecio glastifolius is a species of flowering plant in the aster family known by the common names woad-leaved ragwort, holly-leaved senecio, and pink ragwort. A tall perennial herb, it is native to southern Africa, and it is cultivated as an ornamental plant for its colorful flowers. It has been known to escape cultivation and become naturalized in areas of appropriate climate; it can be found growing wild in parts of New Zealand and Australia.

It favours a Mediterranean climate, often coastal, typically colonizing disturbed soil. It is an annual herb producing a single, erect, branching stem which grows to a height 1 to 1.5 metres tall. The serrated leaves are often more coarsely toothed near the leaf base, and feel prickly. The inflorescence bears flower heads lined with black-tipped bracts. They contain a yellowish disc at the centre, with mauve petals.  
Senecio glastifolius is sometimes confused with Senecio elegans, (which also grows by the coast), but the leaves of the two species are different.

References

External links
Senecio glastifolius description from New Zealand Plant Conservation Network

glastifolius
Flora of South Africa
Flora naturalised in Australia